Catoptria caucasicus is a species of moth in the family Crambidae described by Sergei Alphéraky in 1876. It is found in the northern Caucasus.

References

Moths described in 1876
Crambini
Moths of Asia